Dr. Sir Ervad Jivanji Jamshedji Modi (1854–1933), who also carried the title of Shams-ul-Ulama, was a prominent Zoroastrian Parsi-Indian priest, scholar and community leader in Bombay. One of "the most decorated priests in history", he wrote over 70 books, produced over 120 scholarly papers on Zoroastrian history, traveled and researched into Zoroastrian affairs extensively and was instrumental in organizing the Parsi community in India. During his lifetime he had been called "the greatest living authority on the ancient history and customs of the Parsis."

Books 
  The Religious Ceremonies and Customs of the Parsees (1922)
 My Travels Outside Bombay (written in Gujarati (1926)

Honors and awards
 B.A. (Bombay University, 1876)
 Fellow of the University of Bombay (1887)
 Dip. Litteris et Artibus (Sweden, 1889)
 Shams-Ul-Ulama (Government of British India, 1893)
 Officier d'Academie (France, 1898)
 Officier de l'Instruction Publique (France, 1903)
 Ph.D. (Honoris Causa, Heidelberg, 1912)
 Honorary Correspondent of the Archaeological Department of the Government of India (1914)
 C.I.E. (1917); Campbell Medalist, B.B., Royal Asiatic Society (1918)
 Honorary Member of the Bhandarkar Oriental Research Institute (1923)
 Chevalier de Légion d'honneur (France, 1925)
 Officier de Croix de Merit (Hungary, 1925)
 British Knighthood (1930)
 LL.D. (Honoris Causa, Bombay University 1931)

References

External links 
 Collection of Works by Jivanji Jamshedji Modi - Online

Parsi people from Mumbai
Gujarati people
Zoroastrian priests
1854 births
1933 deaths
Companions of the Order of the Indian Empire
Indian Zoroastrians
Writers from Mumbai
19th-century Indian educational theorists
19th-century Indian historians
20th-century Indian historians
20th-century Indian educational theorists
Zoroastrian studies scholars
Litteris et Artibus recipients
Officiers of the Ordre des Palmes Académiques
Chevaliers of the Légion d'honneur
Indian Knights Bachelor